The Man from the 25th Century is a 1968 short produced by Irwin Allen. It was intended to be a spin-off of Lost in Space and a pilot for a new TV series, but the series never sold.

Synopsis
As a child, Robert Prentiss was abducted from 20th-century Topeka, Kansas, by aliens who claim to be 500 years more advanced than humans. After years of training and conditioning, the adult Prentiss is sent back to Earth with a mission: To destroy Project Delphi and their system that prevents alien invasions. Prentiss, however, finds that he cannot allow the aliens to attack Earth, so he tries to help Delphi to repel them.

Cast
James Darren as Tomo / Robert Prentiss
John Crawford as Bonti
John Napier as Karl Baldwin
Ford Rainey as General George Atwood

References

External links
 
 The Man from the 25th Century at Uncle Oldies
 The Man from the 25th Century at Irwin Allen Page
 The Man from the 25th Century on YouTube

1968 films
1968 short films
1960s science fiction films
Alien abduction films
American science fiction television films
Films set in the 25th century
Television pilots not picked up as a series
1960s American films